HMCS Provider is a name used by several ships of the Royal Canadian Navy -

 , a Fairmile-support depot ship
 , an auxiliary vessel

Royal Canadian Navy ship names